Emily Brown, or Emilie Brown may refer to:

 Emilie Brown, also known as Emily Brown, American director, producer and voice actress
 Emily Brown Portwig (1896–1960), American clubwoman and pharmacist
 Emily Sophie Brown (1881–1985), American politician

See also
 Emil Brown
 Emily Browning